Amelio "Memè" Perlini (8 December 1947 – 5 April 2017) was an Italian actor and film director. His directorial debut, Italian Postcards, was screened in the Un Certain Regard section at the 1987 Cannes Film Festival. 

He directed Teatro La Maschera, of Rome, in his theatrical adaptation of Raymond Roussel's Locus Solus at La MaMa Experimental Theatre Club in New York City in April 1977. The production was co-presented by La MaMa and the International Theatre Institute, and billed as the First International Theater Festival. 

Perlini died in Rome on 5 April 2017, at the age of 69. He seems to have committed suicide by jumping from the fifth floor of his house.

Selected filmography
 A Pocketful of Chestnuts (1970)
 The Grand Duel (1972)
 Quando c'era lui... caro lei! (1978)
 Eugenio (1980)
 Italian Postcards (director and screenwriter, 1987)
 The Family (1987)
 Italian Night (1987)
 Panama Sugar (1990)
 Atto di dolore (1990)
 An American Love (1994)

References

External links

Perlini's page on La MaMa Archives Digital Collections

1947 births
2017 deaths
2017 suicides
Italian male film actors
Italian film directors
Italian screenwriters
Italian male screenwriters
Suicides by jumping in Italy